is one of the preserved throwing techniques,
Habukareta Waza, of Judo.  It belonged to the fourth group, Yonkyo, of
the 1895 Gokyo no Waza lists.  It is categorized as a side sacrifice technique, Yoko-sutemi. The ground version is a turtle turnover.

Related technique
German suplex

See also
The Canon Of Judo

References

External links 
Tachi-waza:
klnjudo.com
www.judo-witry.com
Ne-waza:
www.judoinfo.com
www.jigorokano.it

Judo technique
Grappling
Grappling hold
Grappling positions
Martial art techniques